Burtville may refer to:

 Burtville, Missouri, an unincorporated community in the United States
 Burtville, Western Australia, an abandoned town in Australia